Joan Martin (November 11, 1933 – July 26, 2019) was an All-American Girls Professional Baseball League player.

Baseball career 
According to All American League data, Joan Martin played for the South Bend Blue Sox club in its 1951 season. Additional information is incomplete because there are no records available at the time of the request.

Baseball Hall of Fame 
In 1988 was inaugurated a permanent display at the Baseball Hall of Fame and Museum at Cooperstown, New York, that honors those who were part of the All-American Girls Professional Baseball League. Joan Martin, along with the rest of the girls and the league staff, is included at the display/exhibit.

Personal life 
Martin died July 26, 2019.

References

All-American Girls Professional Baseball League players
1933 births
2019 deaths
Sportspeople from Montgomery County, Pennsylvania
Baseball players from Pennsylvania
21st-century American women